Banana was a Yugoslav pop rock band formed in Belgrade in 1985. They were a prominent act of the Yugoslav rock scene in the late 1980s.

Band history

1985-1988
Banana was formed in 1985. Initially the band went through numerous lineup changes, before a steady lineup was formed: Aleksandra Toković (daughter of the famous composer Dragan Toković, vocals), Dragan Lončar (guitar), Boban Šaranović (bass guitar), Srđan Cincar (keyboards) and Igor Borojević (drums). They released their debut album, Ponoćni pasaži (Midnight Sections) in 1986. The album was pop rock-oriented and featured guitarist Duda Bezuha, Bajaga i Instruktori keyboardist Saša Lokner and former Zamba vocalist and bass guitarist Bogdan Dragović as guest musicians.

In the summer of 1987, the band toured Czechoslovakia, headlining a festival in Prague, and at the beginning of 1988, they released their second album, Banana‚ produced by keyboardist Đorđe Petrović, who, at the time, performed with the band. Aleksandra Toković wrote seven songs which marked the band's shift towards power pop. Soon after the release of their second album, Banana disbanded.

Post breakup
Borojević moved to Partibrejkers, and later started working as a producer, producing the albums by Bjesovi, Piloti, Dža ili Bu, Kristali, Partibrejkers and other acts. Aleksandra Toković became a television presenter at Radio Television of Serbia. Cincar formed the band Fantomi.

Discography
Ponoćni pasaži (1986)
Banana (1988)

References 

Serbian rock music groups
Serbian pop rock music groups
Serbian power pop groups
Yugoslav rock music groups
Musical groups from Belgrade
Musical groups established in 1985
Musical groups disestablished in 1988
1985 establishments in Yugoslavia